In United States agricultural policy, the make allowance (or milk manufacturing marketing adjustment) is the margin between the government support price for milk and the Commodity Credit Corporation (CCC) purchase price for butter, nonfat dry milk, and cheese. This margin is administratively set to cover the costs of “making” milk into butter, nonfat dry milk, or cheese to reach the desired level of prices for milk in manufacturing uses.

References 

United States Department of Agriculture
Dairy farming in the United States
Dairy marketing